The 2019 Jigawa State gubernatorial election occurred on March 9, 2019. Incumbent APC Governor Mohammed Badaru Abubakar won re-election for a second term, defeating Aminu Ibrahim Ringim of the PDP and several minor party candidates.

Mohammed Badaru Abubakar emerged APC gubernatorial candidate after scoring 3,123 votes and defeating his closest rival, Ubale Hashim, who received 54 votes. He picked Umaru Namadi as his running mate. Aminu Ibrahim Ringim was the PDP candidate with Hussain Umar Namadi as his running mate. 19 candidates contested in the election.

Electoral system
The Governor of Jigawa State is elected using the plurality voting system.

Primary election

APC primary
The APC primary election was held on September 30, 2018. Mohammed Badaru Abubakar won the primary election polling 3,123 votes against 1 other candidate. His closest rival was Ubale Hashim, a chieftain of the APC in the state who came second with 54 votes.

Candidates
Party nominee: Mohammed Badaru Abubakar: Incumbent Jigawa State governor
Running mate: Umaru Namadi: Commissioner for finance, Jigawa State
Ubale Hashim: A chieftain of the APC in Jigawa State

PDP primary
The PDP primary election was held on September 30, 2018. Aminu Ibrahim Ringim won the primary election polling 2,028 votes against 3 other candidates. His closest rival Tijani Ibrahim came second with 394 votes, Namadi Husaini came third with 154 votes, while Ali Saad, the first civilian governor of the state polled 30 votes.

Candidates
Party nominee: Aminu Ibrahim Ringim
Running mate: Hussain Umar Namadi
Tijani Ibrahim
Ali Saad: The first civilian governor of the state

Results
A total number of 19 candidates registered with the Independent National Electoral Commission to contest in the election.

The total number of registered voters in the state was 2,109,477, while 1,169,924 voters were accredited. Total number of votes cast was 1,163,206, while number of valid votes was 1,139,054. Rejected votes were 24,152.

By local government area
Here are the results of the election by local government area for the two major parties. The total valid votes of 1,139,054 represents the 19 political parties that participated in the election. Blue represents LGAs won by Mohammed Badaru Abubakar. Green represents LGAs won by Aminu Ibrahim Ringim.

References 

Jigawa State gubernatorial election
Jigawa State gubernatorial election
Jigawa State gubernatorial elections